Southern United Professional Racing (SUPR) operates auto racing series for Late Model and Sprint Car racing on dirt tracks in the Southern United States. Founded in 1990, most of the series' races are held at tracks in Arkansas, Louisiana, Mississippi, and Texas; selected events take place in surrounding states.

Kenny Merchant is the winningest driver in series history, with 57 wins.

Series champions
 1990: Doug Ingalls
 1991: Tony Cardin
 1992: Doug Ingalls
 1993: Donald Watson
 1994: Doug Ingalls
 1995: Ronnie Poche
 1996: Ricky Ingalls
 1997: Butch Patton
 1998: Rusty Cummings
 1999: David Ashley
 2000: Jay Blair
 2001: Jay Blair
 2002: Rodney Wing
 2003: Kenny Merchant
 2004: Rob Litton
 2005: David Ashley
 2006: David Ashley
 2007: Ray Moore
 2008: Kenny Merchant
 2009: Kenny Merchant
 2010: Rob Litton
 2011: Morgan Bagley
 2012: Rob Litton

References

External links

Auto racing organizations in the United States
Dirt track racing in the United States
1990 establishments in Louisiana